Queer as Folk may refer to:

 Queer as Folk (British TV series), 1999–2000
 Queer as Folk (American TV series), a 2000–2005 American and Canadian version of the UK series
 Queer as Folk soundtracks, soundtrack albums from the North American series
 Queer as Folk (2022 TV series), a 2022 American update of the two earlier series